Stefan Martis (1918–87) was a Slovak ace fighter pilot from then-Czechoslovakia in World War II. He served in the Slovak Air Force (SVZ) on the Eastern Front.

References

1918 births
1987 deaths
People from Trenčín District
Slovak aviators
Slovak military personnel